The Illinois College Conference (ICC) was an college athletic conference that operated from 1938 to 1946 in the U.S. state of Illinois. The league was proposed in the spring of 1937 and formed later that year at a meeting in Peoria, Illinois. The ten charter members were Augustana College, Bradley University, Illinois College, Illinois Wesleyan University, Knox College, Lake Forest College, Millikin University, Monmouth College, North Central College, and Wheaton College, all of which had previously been members of the Illinois Intercollegiate Athletic Conference (IIAC), nicknamed the "Little Nineteen". The conference was disbanded in the spring of 1946 and replaced with a new league, the College Conference of Illinois, which was later renamed the College Conference of Illinois and Wisconsin (CCIW).

Championships

Football

References

 
Sports leagues established in 1937
Sports leagues disestablished in 1946
1937 establishments in Illinois
1946 disestablishments in Illinois